The Kota Setar District is a district in Kedah, Malaysia where the state capital Alor Star is situated.

Name
The name Kota Setar came from the setar or ‘Stak’ tree (Bouea macrophylla), an indigenous plant that bore an edible orange coloured fruit.

Administrative divisions

Kota Setar District is divided into 28 mukims, which are:
 Alor Malai
 Alor Merah
 Anak Bukit
 Bukit Pinang
 Derga
 Gunong
 Hutan Kampung
 Kangkong
 Kota Setar
 Kuala Kedah
 Kubang Rotan
 Langgar
 Lengkuas
 Lepai
 Limbong
 Mergong
 Padang Hang
 Padang Lalang
 Pengkalan Kundor
 Pumpong
 Sala Kechil
 Sungai Baharu
 Tajar
 Tebengau
 Telaga Mas
 Telok Chengai
 Telok Kechai
 Titi Gajah

Demographics

Federal Parliament and State Assembly Seats 

List of Kota Setar district representatives in the Federal Parliament (Dewan Rakyat)

List of Kota Setar district representatives in the State Legislative Assembly of Kedah

References